1620 Geographos, provisional designation , is a highly elongated, stony asteroid, near-Earth object and potentially hazardous asteroid of the Apollo group, with a mean-diameter of approximately . It was discovered on 14 September 1951, by astronomers Albert George Wilson and Rudolph Minkowski at the Palomar Observatory in California, United States. The asteroid was named in honor of the National Geographic Society.

Orbit and classification 

Geographos orbits the Sun at a distance of 0.8–1.7 AU once every 1 years and 5 months (508 days). Its orbit has an eccentricity of 0.34 and an inclination of 13° with respect to the ecliptic. Its orbit is well-determined for the next several hundred years. Due to its high eccentricity, Geographos is also a Mars-crosser asteroid. The body's observation arc begins at Palomar, two weeks prior to its official discovery observation.

Close approaches 

As a potentially hazardous asteroid, Geographos has a minimum orbital intersection distance (MOID) with Earth of less than 0.05 AU and a diameter of greater than 150 meters. The Earth-MOID is currently , which translates into 11.7 lunar distances. In 1994, Geographos made its closest approach to Earth in two centuries at 5.0 Gm – which will not be bettered until 2586.

Failed Clementine mission 

Geographos was to be explored by the U.S.'s Clementine mission which was launched in January 1994. However, a malfunction in the spacecraft ended the mission before it could approach the asteroid.

Physical characteristics

Spectral type 

In the Tholen and SMASS classification, Geographos is an S-type asteroid. This means that it is highly reflective and composed of nickel-iron mixed with iron- and magnesium-silicates.

Rotation period 

Since the 1970s, several rotational lightcurve of Geographos have been obtained from photometric observations. Lightcurve analysis gave a rotation period (retrograde sense of rotation) between 5.222 and 5.224 hours with a very high brightness variation between 1.02 and 2.03 magnitude.

Spin axis 

Several lightcurve were also modeled from the abundant photometric observations. In 1994 and 1995, Polish astronomers obtained a concurring period 5.223328 hours and found a spin axis of (54.0°, −52.0°) in ecliptic coordinates (λ, β). Radiometric observations gave a period of 5.223327 hours and a pole of (55.0°, −46.0°). Two other international studies obtained a period of 5.223326 hours and a pole at (56.0°, −47.0°) and (55.0°, −45.0°), respectively.

Shape and structure 

The light curve shows a high amplitude, indicative of its elongated shape, measuring 5.0×2.0×2.1 kilometers, which corresponds to a mean-diameter of 2.5 km.

The interior of the asteroid probably has a rubble-pile structure. The asteroid's high thermal inertia indicates the surface is most likely a mix of fine grains and large rocks and boulders. During the asteroid's close approach to Earth in 1994, a radar study of it was conducted by the Deep Space Network at the Goldstone Observatory, California. The resultant images show Geographos to be the most elongated object in the Solar System.

Diameter and albedo 

According to the observations with the Goldstone Observatory and the space-based surveys carried out by the Infrared Astronomical Satellite IRAS and the NEOWISE mission of the Wide-field Infrared Survey Explorer, Geographos measures between 1.77 and 2.56 kilometers in diameter  and its surface has an albedo between 0.26 and 0.3258. The Collaborative Asteroid Lightcurve Link adopts an albedo of 0.26 and a diameter of 2.5 kilometers based on an absolute magnitude of 15.09.

Naming 

This minor planet was named after the National Geographic Society, in recognition of its contribution to astronomy by supporting the National Geographic Society – Palomar Observatory Sky Survey (NGS-POSS), which produced a photographic atlas of the entire northern sky in the 1950s. NGS-POSS was headed by the second discoverer, Rudolph Minkowski. The Greek word  means geographer (from geo– 'Earth' +  'drawer/writer'). The official  was published by the Minor Planet Center in August 1956.

Notes

References

External links
 NASA Asteroid Radar Research - Radar-Detected Asteroids: 1620 Geographos
 Large amplitude fast rotator (Yahoo Groups)
 Asteroid Lightcurve Database (LCDB), query form (info )
 Dictionary of Minor Planet Names, Google books
 Asteroids and comets rotation curves, CdR – Observatoire de Genève, Raoul Behrend
 
 
 

001620
Discoveries by Albert George Wilson
Named minor planets
001620
001620
001620
001620
19510914